Percnon planissimum or flat rock crab is a species of Percnon  crab found in the Indo-Pacific from Somalia to Cocos Islands, the Philippines and Kermadec Islands.

References

External links
 
 
 

Grapsoidea
Crustacean genera